The 1966 National Semi-Professional Football League was third season of Korea Semi-Professional Football League. The 1966 season was divided into spring league and autumn league. Spring league was held from 16 April to 1 May 1966. Autumn league was held from 25 October to 13 November 1966.

Spring

League
Group A

Group B

Play-off
Semi-finals
30 April 1966 – Korea Electric Power won Daehan Tungsten
30 April 1966 – Seoul Police won Korea Coal Corporation
Final

Champions

Autumn

League
Group A

Group B

Final
Played at Gwangju Stadium, Gwangju

Champions

References

Korean National Semi-Professional Football League